Joshua Terrell Thomas (born November 19, 1996) is an American football safety for the Arizona Cardinals of the National Football League (NFL). He was signed by the Buffalo Bills as an undrafted free agent in 2020 following his college football career at Appalachian State.

Early years
Thomas was born in Montgomery, Alabama and attended The Montgomery Academy where he was a two-time All-State player in football, a four-timer in basketball and became the city's all-time leading boys basketball scorer.

College career
As a senior, Thomas recorded a career-high 72 tackles along with 2.0 tackles for loss, one fumble return for 37 yards and one interception return for a 16-yard touchdown. He was a two-time team captain and started 30 of 56 games.

Professional career

Buffalo Bills
Thomas signed with the Buffalo Bills as an undrafted free agent following the 2020 NFL Draft on May 8, 2020. He was waived during final roster cuts on September 5, 2020, and signed to the team's practice squad the next day. He was elevated to the active roster on October 31 and November 14 for the team's weeks 8 and 10 games against the New England Patriots and Arizona Cardinals, and reverted to the practice squad after each game. He was placed on the practice squad/COVID-19 list by the team on December 28, 2020, and restored to the practice squad four days later. On January 26, 2021, Thomas signed a reserves/futures contract with the Bills.

On August 31, 2021, Thomas was waived by the Bills and re-signed to the practice squad the next day. After the Bills were eliminated in the Divisional Round of the 2021 playoffs, he signed a reserve/future contract on January 24, 2022. He was waived on August 29, 2022.

Arizona Cardinals
On September 1, 2022, Thomas was signed to the Arizona Cardinals practice squad. He signed a reserve/future contract on January 11, 2023.

References

External links
Buffalo Bills bio
Appalachian State Mountaineers football bio

1996 births
Living people
Players of American football from Montgomery, Alabama
American football safeties
Appalachian State Mountaineers football players
Buffalo Bills players
Arizona Cardinals players